Une vie is an album by Dalida, which continues the adult contemporary style of her previous album and contains songs such as the Italian "Mamy blue", "Avec le temps" and "Les choses de l'amour".

Track listing
 Une vie
 Chanter les voix
 Non
 Toutes les femmes du monde
 Mamy blue
 Jésus bambino
 Avec le temps
 Le fermier
 Les choses de l'amour
 Monsieur l'amour
 Tout au plus
 Comment faire pour oublier

Singles
1971 - "Comment faire pour oublier" / "La rose que j'aimais"
1971 - "Jésus bambino" / "Tout au plus"
1971 - "Mamy blue"
1971 - "Avec le temps" / "Monsieur l'amour"
1972 - "Les choses de l'amour" / "Chanter les voix"

References

External links
 Dalida Official Website "Discography" section

Dalida albums
1971 albums